John Greville (died 30 September 1444) was a Member of Parliament for Gloucestershire in seven parliaments (April 1414, 1419, May 1421, 1422, 1423, 1425 and 1427).

Origins
He was one of the six sons of William Greville (d.1401), of Chipping Campden in Gloucestershire, "the flower of the wool-merchants of all England", the leading purchaser of wool from the Cotswold Hills at that time.

Marriages and children
He married twice:
Firstly to Sibyl Corbet (c.1387-27 Aug. 1425), daughter and heiress of Sir Robert Corbet, of Hadley in Shropshire;
Secondly to Joyce Cokesey (c.1406-19 July 1473), widow of Walter Beauchamp, Knt., of Brewham, Somerset, and daughter of Walter Cokesey, of Great Cooksey, Worcestershire, and the sister and heiress of Sir Hugh Cokesey.  After her husband's death in 1444, Joyce married (3rd) Leonard Stapleton, Esq.

His children, by his second wife Joyce, included:
John Greville (died 1480). He was Lord of the Manor of Hunningham. This John Greville succeeded to the vast Cokesay estates upon the death his mother Joyce.
Maurice Greville.

Death and succession
He was buried in All Saints' Church, Weston-on-Avon and was succeeded by his son John Greville (died 1480).

References

English MPs April 1414
John
1444 deaths
English MPs 1419
English MPs May 1421
English MPs 1422
English MPs 1423
English MPs 1425
English MPs 1427
Members of the Parliament of England for Gloucestershire